São José do Egito is a city  in the state of Pernambuco, Brazil. The population in 2020, according with IBGE was 34,056 and the area is 794.1 km².

Geography

 State - Pernambuco
 Region - Sertão Pernambucano
 Boundaries - Brejinho and Itapetim   (N);  Tuparetama and Ingazeira   (S);  Paraiba state  (E);  Santa Terezinha and Tabira   (W)
 Area - 791.9 km²
 Elevation - 585 m
 Hydrography - Pajeú River
 Vegetation - Caatinga  hiperxerófila
 Climate - semi arid - hot and dry
 Annual average temperature - 23.2 c
 Distance to Recife - 394 km

Economy

The main economic activities in São José do Egito are commerce and agribusiness, especially farming of goats, cattle, sheep, pigs, chickens;  and plantations of corn, beans  and tomatoes.

Economic Indicators

Economy by Sector
2006

Health Indicators

References

Municipalities in Pernambuco